is a Japanese manga series written and illustrated by Hiroyuki Nishimori. The manga was initially published in Shogakukan's shōnen manga magazine Shōnen Sunday Zōkan, running monthly from September 1988 to August 1990. The series was then transferred to Weekly Shōnen Sunday and serialized from September 1990 to November 1997. Its chapters were collected in 38 tankōbon volumes. A four-chapter manga sequel, titled Kyō Kara Ore wa!!: Yūsha Sagawa to Ano Futari-hen, was serialized in Shōnen Sunday S from November 2018 to February 2019 and collected in a single tankōbon volume.

Kyō Kara Ore Wa!! was adapted into a 10-episode original video animation (OVA) series by Pierrot, released from April 1993 to December 1997. The series also spawned a V-Cinema direct-to-video live-action series launched from 1993 to 1997, and a live-action film, featuring the same cast and staff from the V-Cinema series, premiered in February 1994. A Japanese television drama adaptation was broadcast on Nippon Television in 2018, and a live-action film, featuring the same cast and staff from the drama, premiered in July 2020.

By March 2018, the Kyō Kara Ore Wa!! manga had over 40 million copies in circulation.

Story
Two boys, Takashi Mitsuhashi and Shinji Itō meet each other at a salon. It turns out both boys are transferring to a new school and decide to take the opportunity to reinvent themselves, to no longer be the run-of-the-mill high school students they used to be, and become the greatest delinquents in Japan.

Characters

Nanyou High
 

A sly high school student. He gave up his ordinary school life and decided to "become a delinquent from today on", after moving to his new home in Chiba. Being a very athletic person, he used his talent for the sole purpose of brawling and actually becomes a real delinquent. To make his appearance more noticeable, he dyed his hair blond. Being the most self-centered person in the story, his own safety comes before anyone else's, he often sacrifices his "friends" for his cause. He is greedy and cunning. Although, beneath his devilish personality lies a softer side, which shows from time to time, especially when he is angry. His fighting style is based around his speed, as he often dodges most attacks, becoming surprised whenever he is forced to block due to being faster than most of the people he encounters. His love interest is Riko Akasaka.

A complete reversal of Mitsuhashi, Itō is the kind of righteous person fighting for justice. Just like Mitsuhashi, Itō got transferred to Nan high's first year. Like his personality, his fighting style is also the opposite of Mitsuhashi's; he is incredibly tough and often stands up from any beating, even in the most bleak of situations. While he may be as strong as Mitsuhashi, Itō is beat up much more often than Mitsuhashi due to often sacrificing himself to protect others as well as fighting fair in unfair situations or against numerable opponents. Due to his help, he wins the affection of Kyōko, an ex-delinquent girl, at the start of the series.
 

The only daughter of the Akasaka style dojo. Originally she visited another senior high school than Mitsuhashi and Itō, but ultimately decided to transfer to Nan high instead to repay Mitsuhashi's favor. Behind her pretty looks lies someone pretty skilled in Aikido; she can handle most delinquents on her own despite her small body size. While she used to be very popular at her old school, in Nan high she is initially considered "weird" because of her constantly hanging out with Mitsuhashi. She spends more and more time with Mitsuhashi, and he sometimes intrudes in her home/dojo, often irritating her father, who also seems to get used to Mitsuhashi. She is romantically interested in Mitsuhashi and is one of the people close to him who know his softer side. She is the only person who refers to Mitsuhashi as "San-chan" because 三 (mitsu) is also read as the number three (san).

Student of the Akasaka style dojo, and in love with Riko. His sense of justice is as strong as Itō's, and he is a modest person who is willing to help people in need out whenever he can. Despite his initially weak body, he never backed down to any delinquent's threat. He was transferred to Nan high together with Riko, which is why everyone calls him "Ryou-kun" like Riko does. Surprisingly, he can hold his own against Mitsuhashi.

A transfer student from Saitama. He originally transferred to Nan high to avoid trouble at his home place of Saitama during the Kitagawa incident, and was quickly at enmity with Mitsuhashi because of his righteous nature, even more so than Itō. When he first appeared, he seems to have an equal charm towards girls as Itō, which only grew when he defeated the duo in a match of Judo. At the end of the Kitagawa incident, he got to know Mitsuhashi's true nature and became friend with them, aiding them multiple times in battle in order to repay their favor. A running gag in the story, is whenever Itō is doing something emotional with Kyōko, he appears and witness an embarrassing scene.

A delinquent from Nan high, who quickly became Mitsuhashi's and Itō's lackey and informant due to his nature "always succumbing to the circumstances". Even though he is no strong fighter, people respect him for the sole sake of him being able to call for Itō and Mitsuhashi's help at any given time.

A delinquent and good friend with Sagawa, also being considered a lackey of Mitsuhashi and Itō.

Riko's girl friend at Nan high, with lots of screentime, but very few times they refer to her with her name.

A junior with passable strength, at least 2 years younger than Mitsuhashi. Mitsuhashi gave him the nickname of "pisshead" because he once peed on them while they were trapped in a well. When introduced, he is an overconfident middle school student and tries to defeat Mitsuhashi. However, he soon gains immense respect for Mitsuhashi after witnessing his strength and looks up to him. Mitsuhashi regards him as a bud despite his young age.

Seiran Girl School
 

A former yankī girl. She becomes Itō's girlfriend near the beginning of the series after he takes a beating in order to rescue her from a group of thugs. Her parents approve of her dating Itō and are just grateful that she is not dating Mitsuhashi.

Benibane High
 

Beni high's banchō, the eldest son of four brothers. Despite his incredible strength, his intelligence is not up to scratch. Even though he looks handsome at first glance, he cannot get a girlfriend because he often unintentionally ends up looking like a fool. Imai possesses impressive strength, usually throwing his opponents. However, he still could not win against many of his rivals. Mitsuhashi often tries to hinder Imai, especially when good things happen to him. Itō, on the other hand, usually gets along with Imai, respecting his honest efforts. He is often looking for ways to better himself.

Imai's lackey and best friend. He respects Imai wholeheartedly and made a promise to follow Imai his entire life. He tends to get involved in a lot of troubles with Imai, and because of his small size, he's usually the first to get picked on. Despite his lack of strength, he has a lot of spirit, which sometimes intimidates people.
 

An obese giant, who also decided to follow Imai as his lackey, after he was defeated in a fight. It is implied that he has anger issues and was thus expelled from his old school. His size makes him a formidable fighter even Imai acknowledges. He likes to refer to Imai as "aniki".

Originally from Ibaraki, Nakano transferred to Beni high due to his quarrel with the local yakuza boss' son. Despite his short stature, he was able to fight on par with Itō and Mitsuhashi during their school trip to Kyoto. His original goal in going to Chiba was to defeat Mitsuhashi, although he later settles in and even joins them in their raid of Akehisa.

Akehisa High

Being the banchō of the delinquent high school Akehisa, he is feared among his enemies and respected amongst his fellowship. He is on par with Mitsuhashi strength-wise, but stopped with his delinquent career the moment he stepped out of his school and entered society.

He is as dangerous as a rabid dog. His methods are as dirty as Mitsuhashi's, however his own twisted character makes him always go a step further than Mitsuhashi. He is the only person who managed to completely disable Mitsuhashi's abilities during their last encounter by severely injuring him.

Satoshi's successors as head (banchō) of Akehisa, he lacks his predecessor strength and characters, often using Akehisa sheer number and name to avoid actual fighting.

Others

A girl who usually fights with a shinai. When she is introduced into the story, she notices her cousin Satoru's bruises from Hokunei. Satoru lies and tells her that it was Mitsuhashi who did it, in order to keep her out of it. However, that only makes things worse and she tries going after Mitsuhashi and the others. Later on, she develops a crush on Imai due to his good nature. She was herself a (unwilling) delinquent and decided to change herself to a normal girl when she transferred, although it did not last very long and she soon became respected by the other delinquents of her new school.

Media

Manga
Kyō Kara Ore Wa!! is written and illustrated by Hiroyuki Nishimori. It was first serialized in the magazine Shōnen Sunday Zōkan, running monthly from September 10, 1988, to August 10, 1990. It was transferred to the magazine Weekly Shōnen Sunday, where it ran from September 19, 1990, to November 5, 1997. Shogakukan collected its chapters in 38 tankōbon volumes, released from December 14, 1989, to March 18, 1998. Shogakukan re-published the series in a 19-volume wide-ban edition released from August 9, 2000, to August 8, 2003, and a 18-volume bunkoban edition released from April 15, 2011, to August 10, 2012.

A series of special new chapters, under the title , were published in Shōnen Sunday S from November 24, 2018, to February 25, 2019. These chapters were compiled into a single tankōbon volume published on April 18, 2019.

Volume list

Original video animation
Kyō Kara Ore Wa!! was adapted into a 10-episode original video animation (OVA) series by Pierrot and directed by Takeshi Mori and Masami Anō. The episodes were released from April 1, 1993, to December 21, 1997.

Episode list

V-Cinema live-action series
Toei Video released a series of V-Cinema direct-to-video live-action series:

 – January 8, 1993 
 – July 9, 1993 
 – January 13, 1995 
 – April 11, 1997 
 – May 9, 1997

1994 live-action film
A live-action film, featuring the same cast and staff from the V-Cinema live-action series, was released on February 19, 1994.

Drama
The manga was adapted into a Japanese television drama in 2018, starring Kento Kaku as Takashi Mitsuhashi, Kentarō as Shinji Itō, Nana Seino as Riko Akasaka, and Kanna Hashimoto as Kyōko Hayakawa, as the main protagonists, and including Yuu Shirota, Tomoya Nakamura, Kenta Suga, Katsuya, Junki Tozuka, and others as antagonists. Nippon TVs series official page reported a number of official guests, including Hirofumi Arai, Nobue Iketani, Shun Oguri, Haruka Shimazaki, Katsumi Takahashi, Shinichi Tsutsumi, Jun Hashimoto, Minami Hamabe, Yūya Yagira, Kento Yamazaki, Takayuki Yamada and Ayumu Yokoyama. Nippon TV translated the TV series title into English as From Today, It's My Turn!!. The series was broadcast for ten episodes on Nippon TV from October 14 to December 16, 2018.

2020 live-action film
A live-action film, featuring the cast from the television drama, was announced in April 2019, with Yuichi Fukuda returning as director. The film is distributed by Toho and premiered on July 17, 2020.

Reception
By March 2018, the manga had over 40 million copies in circulation.

References

External links
  
  
  
 

1993 anime OVAs
1993 films
1994 films
1995 films
1997 films
Comedy anime and manga
Japanese comedy films
Pierrot (company)
Shogakukan manga
Shōnen manga
Yankī anime and manga